Mangone is in the province of Cosenza in the Calabria region of southern Italy.

References

Cities and towns in Calabria
Populated places established in 1504